Hymel is both a surname and a given name. Notable people with the name include:

Bryan Hymel (born 1979), American opera singer
Gary Hymel, American baseball player
Hymel Hunt (born 1993), Australian rugby player
Shelley Hymel, Canadian psychologist